Thipparaa Meesam is a 2019 Indian Telugu-language suspense thriller film starring Sree Vishnu and  Nikki Tamboli with Rohini in an important role.

Cast 
 Sree Vishnu as Mani Shankar
 Nikki Tamboli as Mounika
 Rohini as Lalita, Mani's mother
 Bannerjee as Mani's uncle
 Praveen
 Neha Deshpande
 Lahari Shari as Samyukta
 Raghuvaran as Mani's deceased father (photo shown)

Production 
Sree Vishnu plays a DJ in the film and grew his mustache and beard out to portray the role. His character has negative shades. The film is directed by Krishna Vijay and Nikki Tamboli and Rohini play the female leads. Neha Deshpande was signed to play a supporting role. The teaser was released in September. Krishna Vijay previously worked with Vishnu in Asura (2015). The first look was released in February and the film was initially scheduled to release in the summer.

The film gained popularity since the film released after the successful Brochevarevarura (2019) starring Vishnu.  Thippara Meesam was jointly produced by Rizwan Entertainment and Krishna Vijay L Productions. The trailer was released on 6 November. The theatrical rights for the film were bought by Asian Cinemas. The film released on 8 November.

Soundtrack 
The songs were composed by Suresh Bobbili. The first single "Dhethadi Pochammagudi" released in September and the second single "Mouna Hrudaya Ragam" released in October.

Release 
The film received negative reviews from critics. The Times of India gave the film a rating of two out of five stars and wrote that "After watching Thipparaa Meesam, one feels is like Mani in a key scene, wandering around in boxers and broken sunglasses, confused and affronted at the way the story unfolds". The Hindu wrote that "Sree Vishnu and Rohini shoulder a story of strained bonds between a mother and her son".

References

External links 

2010s Telugu-language films
2019 thriller films
Indian thriller films